Boston City Campus and Business College is a multi-city business college located in South Africa.

Boston City Campus was founded by Ari Katz in 1991. In 1997, Boston City Campus opened a new division called Boston Business College and, after opening 11 colleges in Gauteng, started franchising the concept nationwide.
In 2001, Boston City Campus and Boston Business College merged into one educational entity. Today, the university has 47 colleges and over 20,000 students.

Ranking

References

Business schools in South Africa
Universities in Gauteng
Educational institutions established in 1991
1991 establishments in South Africa